Sveta Nedelja and Sveta Nedjelja may refer to:

 Sveta Nedelja, Istria, a municipality in Croatia
 Sveta Nedelja, Zagreb County (until 1991: Sveta Nedjelja), a town in Croatia
 Sveta Nedjelja, Hvar (or Sveta Nedilja), a village in the town of Hvar, Croatia

See also
 Sveta Neđelja, an island in Montenegro